The 1955 Campeonato Nacional de Fútbol Profesional, was the 23rd season of top-flight football in Chile. Palestino was the tournament’s champion, winning its first ever title.

First stage

Scores

Standings

Championship stage

Scores

Standings

Aggregate table

Relegation stage

Scores

Standings

Aggregate table

Topscorer

References

External links
ANFP 
RSSSF Chile 1955

Primera División de Chile seasons
Primera
Chile